Oskar Albert Suursööt (30 May 1893 – 3 February 1942 Vyatlag labour camp, Kirov oblast, Russia) was an Estonian politician.

1932 he was Minister of Economic Affairs. Arrested by the NKVD on 24 July 1940, was detained in the Gulag prison camp system in Kirov Oblast where he died in custody.

References

1893 births
1942 deaths
People from Saku Parish
People from Kreis Harrien
Farmers' Assemblies politicians 
Patriotic League (Estonia) politicians
Finance ministers of Estonia
Members of the Riigikogu, 1929–1932
Members of the Riigikogu, 1932–1934
Members of the Estonian National Assembly
Members of the Riigivolikogu
Russian military personnel of World War I
Recipients of the Military Order of the Cross of the Eagle, Class III
Recipients of the Military Order of the Cross of the Eagle, Class V
People who died in the Gulag
Estonian people who died in Soviet detention